Osland is a surname, and may refer to:

 Arne Osland (born 1942), American politician
 Einar Osland (1886–1955), Norwegian politician 
 Erna Osland (born 1951), Norwegian teacher and author of children's literature
 Les Osland (1921–1993), Canadian politician
 Paul Osland (born 1964), Canadian runner
 Per Osland, Norwegian physicist